Hot Young Bloods is a 2014 South Korean teen romantic comedy film that depicts the loves, rivalries, and friendships between four high school students in Hongseong County, South Chungcheong Province in the 1980s. Hot Young Bloods was inspired by the short film That's What I Told Her (2013, Daniels Calvin).

Plot
Set in a rural town in 1982, Young-sook (Park Bo-young) is the feared leader of a female gang at Hongseong Agricultural High School. Although she is known for her toughness and foul mouth, she secretly has a crush on Joong-gil (Lee Jong-suk), the biggest playboy in school. Joong-gil is a legendary Casanova whose single glance has the ability to make girls' hearts melt, and he's attempted to woo all the girls at school, except for Young-sook. That's because Gwang-sik (Kim Young-kwang), the leader of a rival school's male gang, views Young-sook as his girl.

Then a new female transfer student, So-hee (Lee Se-young) from Seoul arrives at their high school. So-hee is beautiful, innocent-looking and different from the other girls, and Joong-gil falls for her instantly. The jealous Young-sook picks a fight with So-hee to prevent her new rival from encroaching on her secret crush. Trouble brews as Gwang-sik, suspicious of the ties between Young-sook and Joong-gil, also harasses So-hee to instigate Joong-gil.

Cast
 Park Bo-young as Young-sook
 Lee Jong-suk as Joong-gil 
 Lee Se-young as So-hee
 Kim Young-kwang as Gwang-sik
 Ra Mi-ran as Na-young, a teacher
 Kim Hee-won as Jong-pal, a teacher
 Park Jung-min as Hwang-kyu
 Jin So-yeon as Hwa-seon
 Shin Hyun-tak as Man-chul
 Jeon Soo-jin as Song Yeon-hwa, Young-sook's henchwoman
 Kwon Hae-hyo as Dae-pan, Joong-gil's father
 Kim Ji-eun as Young-sook's classmate
 Lee Chae-eun as young Young-sook
 Han Da-sol as Bicyclist

Historical context
The film is set in a southern agricultural area of Hongseong County in the early 1980s. In 1982, the Korean Ministry of Education eliminated uniforms for middle- and high-schoolers. This created a sense of freedom and individualism for the young people of the time. Uniforms were reinstated in 1986.

Production
Filming began on 1 August 2013 in Sunchang, North Jeolla Province. After three months of filming in Sunchang, the seaside town of Hongseong, and the metropolitan city of Gwangju, the film wrapped on 4 November 2013.

The press conference was held on 30 December 2013, during which actress Park Bo-young revealed that she had a difficult time using the southern accent, which is a mix of Jeolla and Chungcheong dialects. Writer-director Lee Yeon-woo, who was a teenager in the 1980s, said he made the film because he thought it would "be fun to bring to life the experiences of his youth" spent in the countryside of Chungcheong. Lee, whose previous film Running Turtle (2009) had the same setting, said he liked the dialect and the Chungcheong-specific humor and sensibility, and that the retro rom-com was his way of expressing his sentiments about the digital era.

Release
Hot Young Bloods opened in theaters on 23 January 2014. Two weeks after its release, it had recorded 1,570,609 admissions, which was attributed to the film's appeal to younger viewers given its premise and lead stars.

The film's distribution rights to Hong Kong were sold at the American Film Market, followed by Singapore and Malaysia.

Awards and nominations

References

External links
 

2014 films
2010s Korean-language films
South Korean teen comedy films
South Korean high school films
Films set in the 1980s
2014 romantic comedy films
South Korean romantic comedy films
2010s high school films
2010s South Korean films